7Spin Music is an independent Christian record label based in Valparaiso, Indiana. It was founded by Peter Khosla in 2004. Sevenglory’s first single, "Just Me" was the label's first top ten single to chart at R&R magazine.

Artist list

Current
 Sevenglory
 Mark White Band
 The Contact
 Red Umbrella

Former
All Star United
Hello Kelly
Heath McNease
Inhabited
The Blood Violets
This Holiday Life
Riley Armstrong
Playdough

References

External links
Official Facebook page

American record labels
Record labels established in 2004
Christian record labels